Kozak may refer to:
 Kozak (surname)
 Kozak consensus sequence, in molecular biology
 Kozak memorandum, a 2003 proposal aimed at a final settlement of relations between Moldova and Transnistria
 Brian Kozak Award, an award presented annually to the Manitoba Junior Hockey League's defenceman]
 Kozak (armored personnel carrier)

See also
 
 Kazak (disambiguation)
 Kozakov (disambiguation)
 Kazakov, a surname
 Cossack (disambiguation)
 Kossak, a surname